Nicodemus Tessin the Elder (7 December 1615 in Stralsund – 24 May 1681 in Stockholm) was an important Swedish architect.

Biography
Nicodemus Tessin was born in Stralsund in Pomerania and came to Sweden as a young man. There he met and worked with the architect Simon de la Vallée. He worked for the Swedish Chancellor Axel Oxenstierna before he travelled for further studies to Germany, Italy, France and in the Netherlands, where he got to know the new Baroque style in architecture.
Back in Sweden he rebuilt Borgholm Castle, then built Skokloster Castle and the Wrangel Palace in Stockholm. His most important work was Drottningholm Palace, now a world heritage site.

Upon his death his son Nicodemus Tessin the Younger continued his projects.

Selected works
 Borgholm Castle
 Drottningholm Palace
 Bonde Palace
 Skokloster Castle
 Strömsholm Palace
 Näsby castle
 Stenbock Palace
 Wrangel Palace
 Bååt Palace
 Kalmar Cathedral

Literature
 K. Neville, Nicodemus Tessin the Elder. Architecture in Sweden in the Age of Greatness, Turnhout, Brepols Publishers, 2009,

See also
Halltorps

Gallery

1615 births
1681 deaths
People from Stralsund
Swedish nobility
Swedish people of German descent
Swedish Baroque architects
17th-century Swedish people